KRZI (1660 AM, 92.3 FM ESPN Central Texas) is a radio station, paired with an FM relay translator, broadcasting a sports format. Both facilities are licensed to Waco, Texas, United States, and serve the Waco area. KRZI is fully simulcast on sister station 1330 KTON Cameron, extending ESPN Central Texas's coverage area into Temple, Killeen, Belton, and Fort Hood.

Programming

KRZI features programming from ESPN Radio and Westwood One. While the station airs local programming, roughly 75 percent is ESPN content. The associated stations have the broadcast rights for the NFL, the Texas Rangers, The Baylor Bears and NCAA Basketball and Football. Simmons, based in Salt Lake City, Utah, also owns and operates Simmons Radio in Utah, Western Broadcasting, Simmons Lone Star Media, Simmons Outdoor Media, Simmons Ventures and Morris Murdock Travel.

History

KRZI originated as the expanded band "twin" of an existing station on the standard AM band.

On March 17, 1997 the Federal Communications Commission (FCC) announced that eighty-eight stations had been given permission to move to newly available "Expanded Band" transmitting frequencies, ranging from 1610 to 1700 kHz, with the original KRZI authorized to move from 1580 kHz to 1660 kHz.

A construction permit for the expanded band station was assigned the call letters KAXY on January 9, 1998. The FCC's initial policy was that both the original station and its expanded band counterpart could operate simultaneously for up to five years, after which owners would have to turn in one of the two licenses, depending on whether they preferred the new assignment or elected to remain on the original frequency, although this deadline was extended multiple times. It was ultimately decided to transfer full operations to the expanded band station, and on May 18, 2006 the license for the original station on 1580 AM, now with the call sign KQRL, was cancelled. This allowed KEKR 1590 AM Mexia to move farther west in Limestone County, to cover Waco proper with its daytime signal.

AM 1660 changed its call sign to KRZX on August 30, 1999, and to KRZI on October 7, 2004.

In the summer of 2004 KRZI and its sister stations became owned by Simmons Media Group (now Redrock Broadcasting), which in 2009 sold its entire Waco station cluster to M&M Broadcasters.

Translator

References

External links

 - Operation on 1580 kHz (covering 1961-1980 as KBGO / KRZI)

RZI
ESPN Radio stations
Radio stations established in 1998